Household Names is a 4-piece American alternative rock band based in Austin, Texas.

History

The Trouble With Being Nice (2000)
Household Names formed in Austin, Texas in 2000 when songwriter/guitarist Jason Garcia released the debut LP The Trouble With Being Nice, co-produced with Lars Goransson (Blondie, The Cardigans), playing most of the instruments himself or with the help of his drum machine. The album received reviews. The album played on the occasional college radio station(#67 on CMJ Top 200). The track "Bright Spot" was available for download on MTV.com. Additionally, "Secrecy" reached #1 on Garageband.com  gaining mild internet exposure and a review from producer Steve Lillywhite.

In August 2002 the album was selected to be included on computer company Hewlett-Packard's Experience Music Project mobile tour.

Picture In My Head (2006)
The live band had a rotating cast of Austin musicians until 2003, when Chris Peters (bass) and CJ Barker (drums) solidified Household Names into a trio. With Lars Goransson producing, the band released their second full-length album, Picture In My Head on May 6, 2006 to continued reviews  On March 12, 2007, Household Names made their national debut on primetime television when their track "Only One" was used in an episode of ABC's now-cancelled mid season replacement television show "What About Brian?".

Stories, No Names (2010)
CJ Barker left the band in 2007 and was replaced by Joey Spivey; the band also added Eric Roberts on guitar. In 2008 this lineup began recording material for their third album, titled "Stories, No Names", which was released on January 1, 2010. The band is planning a video for the leadoff single, "Driving To L.A.".

References

Further reading
 
 
 
 
 
 
 
 
 

Musical groups from Austin, Texas
Musical groups established in 2000
2000 establishments in Texas